The Museo el Cemí is a history museum in Coabey barrio in Jayuya, Puerto Rico which opened in 1989. The museum building is a replica of a Cemí and showcases Taíno artifacts.

Description 
The museum building was designed and built in the shape of a Cemí, a Taíno deity and is on PR-144 in Coabey, Jayuya. The museum's inauguration was in 1989.

Cemí's were Taíno deities.

Gallery

See also 
 Puerto Rican art

References

External links 

 

Art museums and galleries in Puerto Rico
Museums in Puerto Rico
Tourist attractions in Puerto Rico
Jayuya, Puerto Rico
1989 establishments in Puerto Rico
Museums established in 1989
Native American museums in Puerto Rico
Taíno